Peter Morwood (born 20 October 1956, Northern Ireland) is primarily a fantasy novelist and screenwriter, though he has also written works of science fiction; his best-known works include the Horse Lords series and the Tales of Old Russia series. He lives in Ireland with his wife, writer Diane Duane, with whom he has co-authored several works.

Biography

Early life and education
Morwood was born Robert Peter Smyth in Lisburn, County Antrim, Northern Ireland, and lived there for more than thirty years.  From 1969 to 1975 he attended Friends School Lisburn, a Quaker-operated primary and middle school, and then Queen's University in Belfast, where he studied English literature and acquired an honours bachelor's degree with an emphasis on middle-English poets such as Chaucer.  During this period Morwood also took pilot training as a cadet pilot with the Queen's University Student Air Squadron of the Royal Air Force; though budgetary considerations (on the Air Force's side) forced Morwood to make a choice between his degree studies and his further studies as a pilot.  He chose to continue his work in English literature, and subsequently resigned his commission.

Civil service and writing
After graduation from university in 1979, Morwood took a position in the UK's civil service as a clerk working for the Customs and Excise.  

During this period he began work on his first novel, which he submitted and sold in 1982.  He adopted the pen name "Peter Morwood" in honour of his mother, whose maiden name was Morwood, and he legally changed his surname to match the pen name in the mid-1980s. His second and third novels were published in 1984 and 1986.

Personal life
At a science fiction convention in Glasgow, Scotland in 1985, Morwood was introduced by author Anne McCaffrey to his future wife, the fantasist and science fiction writer Diane Duane. After several more meetings and a brief courtship, Morwood asked Duane to marry him, and they celebrated their engagement at the World Science Fiction Convention in Atlanta, Georgia. Morwood then returned to Northern Ireland to complete his term of employment in the Civil Service, and resigned his post in December 1986. Shortly thereafter he relocated to Los Angeles, California, where Duane was working for the animation studio DiC.  They were married at the New England regional science fiction convention, Boskone, on 15 February 1987.  

Later in 1987, Morwood and Duane relocated briefly to Scotland, and then, after a short period spent roving the United Kingdom, to County Wicklow in Ireland, where the two of them reside, in Dunlavin as of 2019.

Bibliography

The Book of Years and Clan Wars sequences
These two sequences of books center on a feudal-style realm called Alba and the struggles of various clans for its domination. The first sequence is told from the point of view of Aldric Talvalin, scion of a warrior clan of Alba, who is unwillingly drawn into the bloody intrigues of Alban politics and the machinations of the Drusalan Empire, including its power-behind-the-throne, the evilly scheming and sorcerous Commander Voord.

 The Horse Lord, 1983
 The Demon Lord, 1984
 The Dragon Lord, 1986
 The Warlord's Domain, 1989

A fifth book (tentatively titled The Shadow Lord) and a sixth (title as yet indeterminate) have been projected for more than two decades.

The four Horse Lords novels were reissued by DAW Books in 2005 as a pair of two-book omnibus volumes:
 The Book Of Years, Volume 1
 The Book Of Years, Volume 2
In Volume 2, the novel previously published as The Warlord's Domain was restored to its intended title, The War Lord.

The Clan Wars sequence is (so far) a pair of prequels, telling the story of how the Clan Lords (including Aldric Talvalin's remote ancestors) invaded the land of Alba, settled it, and eventually came to dominate it.
 Greylady
 Widowmaker

A third volume (tentatively titled Cradlesong) is projected.

Tales of Old Russia
This series, densely interwoven with motifs from Russian folktale and legend, tells the story of the young tsar Ivan Khorlovskiy, heir to the throne of the city of Khorlov.  Complications instantly ensue when he meets, on a battlefield full of the slain, the sorceress-tsarevna Marya Morevna, "the most beautiful princess in all the Russias", and becomes involved willy-nilly in her entanglement with the ancient and deadly being known as Koschei the Undying. The series goes on to deal humorously with the difficulties of a "two-kingdom household", especially when one partner is both a skilled sorcerer and the mother of one's (rather unusual) children, and – more seriously – with the political problems that can beset a small independent tsardom in the face of such threats as the Teutonic Knights and the Golden Horde of the Great Khan.  

Prince Ivan (1990)
Firebird (1992)
The Golden Horde (1993)  

A fourth volume, The Blue Kremlin, is projected since the mid-1990s.

Star Trek 
Morwood has written one solo Star Trek novel:

 Star Trek: The Original Series #48: Rules of Engagement

He has also collaborated on one with Diane Duane (this novel was written during their honeymoon):

 Star Trek: TOS: Rihannsu #2: The Romulan Way

Other prose works
Morwood has occasionally collaborated with Diane Duane on other novels, primarily in "licensed" universes or shared-world scenarios.  These include:

The Space Cops sequence:
 Mindblast 
 Kill Station 
 High Moon 

Others:
 Keeper of the City 
 SeaQuest DSV

Screen works

Animation
Morwood has written various animated scripts, often in collaboration with his wife.  These include:

 Batman: The Animated Series (1995)
 Red Claw Rising
 Gargoyles (1996)
 The Hound of Ulster 
 Ill Met by Moonlight
 Spider-Man Unlimited (2001)
 Enter the Hunter!

Live action
In 1999, Morwood began development work along with Duane on a live-action retelling of one of the great German epics, the Nibelungenlied. The script they wrote between late 2002 and mid-2003 was produced as a miniseries for the German satellite network Sat.1 by Tandem Communications of Munich, in association with Sony/Columbia Pictures.  Directed by Uli Edel, the miniseries, under the title Die Nibelungen, won a DIVA Award for best German movie-for-TV of 2004. A feature version, entitled Sword of Xanten in the UK, screened there late in 2004; a "megafeature" cut of the entire miniseries aired on Channel Four television in the UK in December 2005. 

The miniseries had its premiere USA airing on the Sci-Fi Channel in late March 2006 under the title Dark Kingdom: The Dragon King. It has also been released on DVD in the US and many other markets, under various titles (the previous US title is Curse of the Ring.)

External links 
 
Bibliography at SciFan
PeterMorwood.com

1956 births
Living people
Irish science fiction writers
Irish fantasy writers
Male novelists from Northern Ireland